The following are the national records in track cycling in India, maintained by the Cycling Federation of India.

Men

Women

References
General
Indian Track Cycling Records 20 August 2021 updated
Specific

External links
Cycling federation of India website
Cycling federation of India records page

India
Records
track cycling
track cycling